Paul Jean François Cousturier (14 April 1849 – 27 July 1921) was governor of French Guinea, 2 November 1900 to 28 September 1904. 
After his retirement, he became a well-known botanist.

Early years

Paul Cousturier was born on 14 April 1849 in Montereau, Seine-et-Marrte.
His brother Edmond Cousturier was a painter and art critic, who married the artist Lucie Cousturier on 6 January 1901.

Paul Cousturier entered the colonial administration in August 1885.
On 16 August 1885 he was appointed Chief of the Administrative Secretariat of the French Establishments in the Gulf of Guinea under Noël Ballay.
On 24 October 1887 Cousturier was named sous-chef of the interior of the colony, where he introduced the colonial administration. He followed Ballay to Rivières du Sud, and with him explored the Conakry region, where the city of Conakry was established in 1889. He assisted Ballay in delimiting the boundary between Rivières du Sud and Sierra Leone.

French Guinea

In December 1891, Cousturier was named governor of Guinea, replacing Ballay.
He was acting governor of the Rivières du Sud region, now Guinea, between October 1891 and January 1892.
He was again acting governor of Guinea from 22 July 1892 to June 1893 during the absence of Noël Ballay.
He was governor of Guinea again between 1895 and 1896, and was made acting governor of Guinea again in 1898.

On 3 November 1900 he was named governor of French Guinea, holding this post until November 1904.
The sixth annual Agricultural fair was held in Conakry on 15 February 1902. 
Alfa Yaya, chief of the province of Labé came to pay homage to governor Cousturier accompanied by more than 1,000 men and sixty horses.
In 1902 Cousturier established a line of six customs posts from Dankaldou to Kolodougou along the Liberian border. In November 1902 he opened the railway from Conakry to Simbaya, the first part of a longer line to Kindia, opened two years later.

Later career

When he returned to France in November 1904 he had spent twenty years in Africa, apart from four leaves totaling twenty one months.
He left for Saint Pierre and Miquelon the same month.
He was governor of St Pierre and Miquelon for a year after leaving Guinea.

After his retirement he devoted himself to botany, making long trips in which he explored the mountains of Corsica, Crete and Andorra.
He became a member of the Botanical Society of France in 1911.
Paul Cousturier joined the Société d'histoire naturelle de Toulon in 1912.
He died on 27 July 1921 at Aix-en-Provence.
His botanical collections and his correspondence with his colleague, the Abbé Michel Gandoger, were kept by the University of Provence in Marseille.

Bibliography

References

Sources

 

Governors of French West Africa
1849 births
1921 deaths